The weak gravity conjecture (WGC) is a conjecture regarding the strength gravity can have in a theory of quantum gravity relative to the gauge forces in that theory. It roughly states that gravity should be the weakest force in any consistent theory of quantum gravity.

See also
 Swampland (physics)
 Fundamental interaction

References

Theoretical physics
Quantum gravity
String theory
Conjectures